"Le Plus doux chemin" ("The Sweetest Path"), Op. 87, No. 1, is a song by Gabriel Fauré, composed in 1904. It was originally for voice and piano accompaniment, and was later arranged by the composer for voice and full orchestra.

Composition
In this song Fauré set words by the poet Paul Armand Silvestre. It was composed in 1904 for the amateur singer Emilie Girette after her marriage to the pianist Édouard Risler. Originally for voice and piano, it was later orchestrated by Fauré as part of his incidental music for Masques et bergamasques (1919). Fauré composed the song in the key of F minor, but it was first published (Hamelle, Paris, 1907) in E minor.

When Fauré orchestrated the song for Masques et bergamasques he wrote to his wife that it was not at all well known: "for just as pianists play the same eight or ten of my pieces, so singers all sing the same songs". The pianist Graham Johnson calls it an "enchantingly mournful serenade of a persistent, if unsuccessful lover … Fauré distilled to the essentials". Both Johnson and Vladimir Jankélévitch find an autumnal quality in the song, despite the reference to "la saison nouvelle". The Fauré expert Jean-Michel Nectoux rates it among the composer's most inspired songs, and groups it with "Le Ramier", Op. 87, No. 2 and "Chanson", Op. 94 as "a kind of homogeneous triptych … a cheerful but nostalgic farewell, the last sparks of the galant madrigal which Fauré had practised for so long".

Analysing the song, Johnson describes it as a madrigal with an accompaniment evoking
"the gentle plucking of a lute, although the strength of the bass line, almost a counter-melody in itself, depends on the legato tone of a piano to make its effect."

Text

References

Sources
 
 
 

Compositions by Gabriel Fauré
1904 compositions